Hetman is a historical military title in Poland, Lithuania, Ukraine.

Hetman may also refer to:

Hetman Białystok, Polish football team
Hetman Zamość, Polish football team
Hetman (train), Polish fast train
 Hetman is the Polish name for the chess queen.

People with the surname
Vadym Hetman (1935–1998), Ukrainian politician

See also 
Heitmann